Varvara Alekseevna Morozova (1848-1917) was a Russian industrialist. She was the daughter of Aleksey Khludov and married to Abram Abramovich Morozov and Vasily Mikhailovich Sobolevsky. She was the acting president of the Tver Manufactory Association from 1882. She was also the perhaps most famed philanthropist in Moscow and awarded with an Imperial medal for her charitable work, known particularly as the patron of the Moscow University.

Family
With Abram Morozov she had three sons:
 Mikhail Abramovich Morozov (1870-1903), eldest son
 Ivan Morozov (1871–1921), second son was a Russian businessman and from 1907 to 1914 a major collector of avant-garde French art.
 Arseny Abramovich Morozov (1874-1908), youngest son

References
 Варвара Алексеевна Морозова: На благо просвещения Москвы / Библиотека-читальня им. И. С. Тургенева. Сост., вступ. ст., подготов. текстов, примеч. Н. А. Круглянской. Текст Н. А. Круглянской и В. Н. Асеева. — М.: Русский путь, 2008. В 2-х тт.

19th-century businesswomen from the Russian Empire
1848 births
1917 deaths
Russian philanthropists
19th-century philanthropists